Arago de Séte is a French professional volleyball club based in Sete, France. They currently compete in the top flight of French volleyball, the LNV Ligue A.

History
Arago de Séte was founded in 1953 by former students of the Arago School, including Maurice Vié, who became the club's first president. The club initially included a variety of sports in addition to volleyball, including judo and table tennis. In 1968 the club became volleyball specific.

Team

First Team Squad
This is the Arago de Séte team for the 2018–19 Ligue A season.

Head coach:  Fabian Dugrip

References

External links
Official Website 
Team profile at Volleybox.net

French volleyball clubs
Volleyball clubs established in 1953
1953 establishments in France